Nesma Alaa Eldin Ali Mahgoub (born September 26, 1989) is an Egyptian singer and actress. who started her professional career after winning the 8th season of Star Academy - MENA in 2011. Mahgoub has the skill to sing in many languages, like Egyptian Arabic, English, Italian, French, Spanish, German, Latin and even Hindi. She excels in her musical career singing Oriental, Pop, Rock, Opera, and much more. Now Mahgoub has decided to dedicate her time to her original music and finding songs that will complete her new music vision.

Study

Nesma Mahgoub finished her Abitur in the German School, DEO in 2008. During her school years, Mahgoub won several prizes in the German competition “Jugend Musiziert” in Egypt, Germany and many other European countries. She has always been a very special student of the famous Egyptian soprano, Dr. Neveen Allouba. She studied music in AUC and graduated with a Bachelor of musical arts majoring in Performance and minoring in Theater in 2013. 
She starred as the main role in many musicals done by The American University in Cairo, like Queen Dido in the famous opera, Dido & Aeneas by Henry Purcell , Lucy England in The Telephone (opera) by Gian Carlo Menotti and Eponine in the famous musical, Les Miserables (musical) by Claude-Michel Schönberg, which started off as her graduation project and grew into being a huge production produced by Dr. Neveen Allouba's musical theater company and academy, Fabrica.
After graduation, she kept developing her Pop & Rock vocal capabilities by training with the CVT- (Complete Vocal Technique) authorized vocal coach, Sherif Al Dabaa. Mahgoub has always been fond of her academic side, so in 2017 she decided to take a big step by teaching in The American University in Cairo. She teaches voice and developed a new course to help singers on stage and teach them how to perform. She is also the conductor and director of the AUC Pop Ensemble, A caPop.

Discography

Albums

 Hatolly Eh (2012) Label: MusicaPro
Arouma (2021)  
-Kefaya ft. Amir Hedayah (2021)

-Ya Ghawy Horoub (2021)

Singles

 Matkhalish Haga Twa'afak (2012)
 Hob Ekhwat (2015)
 Dawam Elhal Mohal (2015) El Donia Ma'louba movie
Atliqi Sirraki -Let It Go (arabic)- (2013) Frozen dubbed movie
 Mestaghraba (2016)
 Wujuh (2016)
 Ya Mahrousa (2018) Al Kenz movie
 Elhob Elmostaheel (2018) Al Kenz movie
 Mashya Ma'ak (2018) Al Kenz movie
 Hobby Lik (2018) Layaly Eugenie Ramadan series
 Elhob (2019) Al Kenz 2 movie
 Elhob Naro Fil Oloub (2019) Al Kenz 2 movieEzhary -Show Yourself (Arabic)- (2019) Frozen 2 dubbed movie
 Dawar Al Saada (2020)
 Kol Shams W Liha Del (2020)

Dubbing

Nesma started her dream of dubbing cartoons with voicing Elsa in the Arabic dub of Disney's Frozen, performing "Atliqi Sirraki", the Arabic version of "Let It Go". After this movie's success, she voiced Queen Elsa in all Frozen-related movies and series by Disney ending with Frozen,'' as she continued voicing Elsa in Frozen II, performing "Ezhary", the Arabic version of "Show Yourself". 
Mahgoub also dubbed many other characters in Egyptian and American Animations, like Ice Age: Collision Course (also known as Ice Age 5)

Theater

Nesma has been performing on stage since she was 10 years old. She considers it to be her second home where she feels most confident. After graduation, she pursued her love of standing on stage and performing by being an active member of Fabrica for a few years. She continued to play Epoinine in Fabrica's Arabic version of Les Miserables (musical) and was cast as the gypsy in their version of El Leila El Kebira by Sayed Mekawy.
In 2015, Mahgoub played the lead role of a new Arabic original musical, called “Donia Habibty” , with the actor, Kamal Abu Raya. The musical showed her unique talent as a singer, actress and dancer and was directed by the famous director, Galal El Sharkawy.

TV

Mahgoub recorded various songs for movies, series and ads. She has shown her musical skills in Sahibat Al Saada TV show, hosted by Essad Yunis , where she created and performed medleys of the most famous international songs from around the world and famous songs from the Middle East.

Awards

 Awarded “Best Movie Song”in Arabian Cinema Awards (ACA) for her song, 2018 “Elhob Elmostaheel” in the Egyptian movie, ElKenz
 Awarded “Best Talent” in Sahebat Al Saada TV Show in Middle East Music Awards (MEMA) 2016
 Awarded “Best Female Youth Singer” in DearGuest 2015
 Nominated as “Best Female Singer” in the Murex D’or 2015
 Awarded “Best Female Youth Singer in 2012” in Middle East Music Awards (MEMA) 2013
 Honored for outstanding achievement in Music Performance major, 2012 The American University in Cairo
 Won Star Academy 8, a four month reality show for singers, Beirut/Lebanon 2011
 Awarded for Arabic Singing, “Old is Gold” competition, 9th International Summer Festival, 2010 Bibliotheca Alexandrina, Alexandria/Egypt
 Awarded 1st Prize, Final Round, in the German competition “Jugend Musiziert” 2010 in category Solo Pop Singing, Germany
 Awarded 1st Prize, Final Round, in the German competition “Jugend Musiziert” 2009 in category Solo Musicals, Essen/Germany
 Honored for outstanding achievement in music in the German School in Dokki (DEO), Cairo 2008
 Awarded 1st Prize, Round 2, in the German competition “Jugend Musiziert” 2008 in category Solo Opera Singing, Thessaloniki/Greece
 Awarded 2nd Prize, Final Round, in the German competition “Jugend Musiziert” 2007 in category Duet Ensemble, Erlangen/Germany

References 

 Nesma Mahgoub's IMDb bio
 Honna (هن) by El Wattan News's article on Nesma Mahgoub
 Elcinema.com website Mahgoub's biography
 El Ahram Online's article about Nesma

External links
 
 
Nesma Mahgoub on Youtube

21st-century Egyptian women singers
Egyptian voice actresses
Living people
1989 births
Contestants from Arabic singing competitions
Singers from Cairo